Horst Kutscher (July 5, 1931 – January 15, 1963) was a German coal apprentice and the 36th person to die trying to cross the Berlin Wall from East Berlin to West Berlin.

Early life 
Kutscher was born on July 5, 1931, in Trepkow, the fourth of 13 children to a mechanical engineer and a flower seller.

Biography 
In April 1956, he fled to West Germany, with his wife and children later following him. A year later, he and his family returned to Berlin-Treptow. He worked as a "border-crosser" in the West until the border was closed in August 1961.

Death 
On January 15, 1963, at the border near Rudower Strasse at the sector border between Berlin-Treptow and Berlin-NeuköllnKutscher, Kutscher slid under the barbed-wire fence and then along the security trenches with 25 meters left when he was fatally shot in the head.

After the collapse of East Germany, Kutscher’s ex-wife was a witness in the trial against the guard who shot Kutscher. In August 1997, the former guard was sentenced to one year and three months' probation.

See also 
 List of deaths at the Berlin Wall
 Berlin Crisis of 1961

References

External links 
 

Berlin Wall Memorial - Horst Kutscher

1931 births
1963 deaths
Deaths at the Berlin Wall
People from East Berlin
Deaths by firearm in East Germany
People from Treptow-Köpenick
East German defectors